KZAX-LP is a Variety formatted broadcast radio station licensed to and serving Bellingham, Washington.  KZAX-LP is owned and operated by Make.Shift.

References

External links
 Make.Shift Community Radio Online
 

Variety radio stations in the United States
Radio stations established in 2016
ZAX-LP
ZAX-LP
2016 establishments in Washington (state)